Priazovye is the Azov Sea littoral, or a more narrow sense, its northern part, within Ukraine.

Priazovye may also refer to:
FC Priazovye Yeysk, a football (soccer) club in Yeysk, Russia
SSV-201 Priazovye, a [Vishnya-class intelligence ship]], Russia